Amadeus III may refer to:

 Amadeus III of Savoy (1095–1148), Count of Savoy and Crusader
 Amadeus III of Geneva (1311–1367), Count of Geneva